The Illegal Immigration Reform and Immigrant Responsibility Act of 1996 (IIRIRA or IIRAIRA), Division C of , made major changes to the Immigration and Nationality Act (INA). IIRIRA's changes became effective on April 1, 1997.

Former United States President Bill Clinton asserted that the legislation strengthened "the rule of law by cracking down on illegal immigration at the border, in the workplace, and in the criminal justice system — without punishing those living in the United States legally". However, IIRIRA has been criticized as overly punitive "by eliminating due process from the overwhelming majority of removal cases and curtailing equitable relief from removal". A range of critiques have emerged concerning the provisions enacted with IIRIRA, such as the expansion of aggravated felonies, creation of the 287(g) program, reduction in due process rights, and intensified funding of border militarization. With IIRIRA, all noncitizens, regardless of legal status and including long-term legal permanent residents, became subject to removal and greatly expanded the offenses that could lead to formal deportation.

Proponents of the IIRIRA present the case that the policy provided a much needed end to numerous loopholes present beforehand in US immigration policy, which ultimately undermined their efficacy. The ultimate goal of the IIRIRA has been to deter further illegal immigration into the US, and despite a noticeable increase in annual deportations since the policy was enacted in 1996 from around 50,000 to over 200,000 by the beginning of the 2000s, overall illegal immigration has increased since the policy's enactment according to data compiled by the Pew Research Center.

Before IIRIRA, nonimmigrants who overstayed their visas or violated their status could pay a fine that would allow them to adjust their status to permanent residence status. With IIRIRA, however, lawfully admitted nonimmigrants who overstay their visas by one day or longer became ineligible for a new nonimmigrant visa. If the period of overstay ranged from 180 to 365 days, the noncitizen would face a 3-year bar to reentry, and an overstay of more than 365 days would require a 10-year bar. These provisions impact noncitizens who were admitted before and after the enactment of IIRIRA. In these circumstances, a noncitizen who falls under these categories would be subject to summary removal if attempting to reenter the United States. In these removal proceedings, the noncitizen does not have a right to a hearing or a lawyer and is subject to a 5-year bar of entry.

Public Charge 
IIRIRA imposed new regulations concerning public charge determinations for noncitizens seeking admission. IIRIRA requires that the individual(s) petitioning a family-sponsored immigrant must provide an affidavit of support. In the affidavit, the petitioner must "agree to provide support to maintain the sponsored alien at an annual income that is not less than 125 percent of the federal poverty guidelines" until the noncitizen naturalizes as a U.S. citizen or the noncitizen, the noncitizen's parent, or the noncitizen's spouse has worked for 40 qualifying quarters.

Aggravated Felonies 
With IIRIRA, the US Congress expanded the definition of the term aggravated felony. Aggravated felonies were first initiated with the Anti-Drug Abuse Act of 1988, and aggravated felonies consisted of murder, drug trafficking, and illicit firearm trafficking. The Anti-Drug Abuse Act of 1988 made any noncitizen convicted of an aggravated felony at any time after their entry into the United States deportable. The Immigration Act of 1990, Immigration and Nationality Technical Corrections Act of 1994 and Anti-terrorism and Effective Death Penalty Act of 1996 increased the types of offenses considered aggravated felonies. In addition, with these laws, crimes with a penalty of 5 years or longer would be considered an aggravated felony.

After IIRIRA, however, the penalty was changed so that any crime with a penalty of one year or longer would be considered an aggravated felony.
 Any noncitizen who is convicted of an aggravated felony can face collateral immigration consequences: "noncitizens who have been convicted of an 'aggravated felony' are prohibited from receiving most forms of relief that would spare them from deportation, including asylum, and from being readmitted to the United States at any time in the future". There is a "presumption of deportability" for noncitizens convicted of aggravated felonies, in which noncitizens "convicted of an aggravated felony shall be conclusively presumed to be deportable from the United States".

Importantly, aggravated felony charges can be applied retroactively, so if a change in the law deems a new category of offense an aggravated felony, any noncitizen previously convicted of that offense can then face removal.

Under IIRIRA, any noncitizen convicted of an aggravated felony is categorically barred from cancellation of removal and placed in a form of expedited removal proceedings (but these are distinct from expedited removal). Under IIRIRA, expedited removal proceedings for noncitizens with aggravated felony charges are under the purview of the Attorney General who "shall provide for the initiation and, to the extent possible, the completion of removal proceedings, and any administrative appeals thereof, in the case of any alien convicted of an aggravated felony before the alien's release from incarceration for the underlying aggravated felony". Under these expedited removal proceedings, noncitizens do attend immigration court, and they are afforded the right to counsel (at no expense to the government) for their immigration court proceedings and judicial review of their determination of removal.

Removal 
IIRIRA merged exclusion and deportation proceedings into removal proceedings. All noncitizens who are removable are subject to removal proceedings. Prior to IIRIRA, noncitizens were subject to either deportation proceedings or exclusion proceedings. Deportation was reserved for noncitizens who "made an 'entry' into the U.S.", whereas exclusion proceedings were reserved for noncitizens who had not made entry into the United States. The consolidation of exclusion and deportation proceedings into removal proceedings was an attempt to streamline the process of deportation and exclusion. Under IIRIRA, noncitizens "admitted to the United States, [noncitizens] applying for admission, and [noncitizens] present in the United States without being inspected and admitted" were all subject to removal proceedings. Removal proceedings are adjudicated by immigration judges, which fall under the purview of the Executive Office of Immigration Review, which is part of the Department of Justice.

Post-IIRIRA removal proceedings are initiated with a notice to appear (NTA) that is sent to the noncitizen. NTAs replaced Order to Show Cause and Notice of Time and Place documents. NTAs specify, among other things, "the nature of the proceedings against the alien", "the legal authority under which the proceedings are conducted", "the acts or conduct alleged to be in violation of the law" and "the charges against the alien and the statutory provisions alleged to have been violated". IIRIRA established the authority of immigration judges in removal proceedings. Immigration judges "shall administer oaths, receive evidence, and interrogate, examine, and cross-examine the alien and any witnesses. The immigration judge may issue subpoenas for the attendance of witnesses and presentation of evidence".

Noncitizens have the right to a "reasonable opportunity to examine the evidence against the alien, to present evidence on the alien's own behalf, and to cross-examine witnesses presented by the Government" but not the right "to an application by the alien for discretionary relief under this Act". Further, under IIRIRA, noncitizens "have the privilege of being represented, at no expense to the Government, by counsel of the [noncitizen's] choosing". Therefore, noncitizens can have legal representation in immigration court, but they not entitled to legal representation provided by the Government if they cannot afford an attorney.

IIRIRA established a removal period of 90 days for noncitizens determined to be removable by an immigration judge. The removal period can begin when "the date the order of removal becomes administratively final", "the date of the court's final order" or if the date at which the noncitizen is released from detention (only in cases of non-immigration related detention). Noncitizens can file one motion to reconsider the decision of an immigration judge, which must be filed within 30 days of the final order being issued. Noncitizens can also file 1 motion for reopening their case, which must be filed within 90 days of the final order of removal.

Cancellation of Removal 
IIRIRA restricted noncitizens' access to cancellation of removal, which is a form of relief from deportation. Prior to IIRIRA, noncitizens could receive cancellation of removal through discretionary relief from the Attorney General (this relief is carried out by immigration judges within Executive Office of Immigration Review. In general, before IIRIRA noncitizens could become eligible for cancellation of removal if they "established seven years continuous physical presence in the U.S., good moral character during that period, and that deportation would result in extreme hardship to the individual or to his or her spouse, parent, or child who was a U.S. citizen or lawful permanent resident". Cancellation of removal resulted in individuals becoming lawful permanent residents.

IIRIRA restricted the requirements for individuals to become eligible for cancellation of removal and capped the number of cancellations available to 4,000 annually. With IIRIRA, cancellation required continuous physical presence in the U.S. for 10 years prior to the initiation of removal proceedings, which is called the stop-time rule. In 1997, the Bureau of Immigration Appeals ruled that the stop-time rule can also be applied retroactively to individuals who began removal proceedings prior to IIRIRA's implementation. An additional IIRIRA mandated requirement for cancellation of removal is that noncitizens must demonstrate that removal would lead to "exceptional and extremely unusual hardship" to the individual's spouse, parent, or child who is a U.S. citizen or noncitizen with legal permanent residence status. IIRIRA eliminated the possibility of cancellation due to the hardship an individual themselves could face.

Expedited Removal 
IIRIRA established expedited removal, in which immigration officials gained the authority to summarily remove certain noncitizens. This is different from the expedited removal proceedings for noncitizens convicted of aggravated felonies. Noncitizens subject to expedited removal include noncitizens "who are inadmissible because they lack valid entry documents or have sought admission through fraud (may also include aliens inadmissible on same grounds if they are present in the United States without being admitted or paroled and have been in the country less than two years)".

Expedited removals can be considered removals without hearings: these removals do not require judicial review by immigration judges within the Executive Office of Immigration Review unless the individual plans to apply for asylum or indicates fear of persecution. Therefore, noncitizens subject to expedited removal do not have the right to administrative review or the right to administrative appeal and judicial review. Because expedited removals do not require judicial or administrative review, noncitizens who are subject to expedited removals are not afforded the right to an attorney during their interviews with immigration officials.

Stipulated Removal 
IIRIRA initiated stipulated removal, which is a type of plea agreement for noncitizens who are convicted of crimes in criminal court. Stipulated removal orders under IIRIRA can be enacted for noncitizens facing felony and misdemeanor convictions that are considered aggravated felonies.  Stipulated removal allocated to United States federal district court judges "jurisdiction to enter a judicial order of removal pursuant to the terms of such stipulation".

Orders of stipulated removal "constitute a conclusive determination of the [noncitizen's] removability from the U.S." The plea agreements for stipulated removal orders make a "judicial order of removal form the United States […] a condition of the plea agreement" for the criminal conviction or a "condition of probation or supervised release, or both". With stipulated removal, noncitizens "waive the right to notice and hearing" for a determination of their removability.

IIRIRA initiated exceptions for stipulated removal for individuals in "exceptional circumstances":  serious illness of the alien or serious illness or death of the spouse, child, or parent of the alien, but not including less compelling circumstances) beyond the control of the alien.

Reinstatement of Removal 
IIRIRA implemented a process called reinstatement of removal. Reinstatement of removal concerns the reentry of undocumented immigrants who previously left through voluntary departure or who were previously issued orders of removal who entered without lawful admission. With reinstatement of removal, "the prior order of removal is reinstated from its original date and is not subject to being reopened or reviewed" and the immigrant is ineligible for applying for or receiving any relief from removal. Reinstatement of removal allows for the individual to "be removed under the prior order at any time after the reentry".

Bond and Immigration Detention 
IIRIRA expanded the authority of the Attorney General to detain noncitizens who are facing removal. Under IIRIRA, noncitizens "may be arrested and detained pending a decision on whether the [noncitizen] is to be removed from the United States". IIRIRA did not impose any limitations on the length of detention, but IIRIRA did restrict these noncitizens' access to release from detention. Release could be granted with a "bond of at least $1,500" or on "conditional parole". Noncitizens without legal permanent residence or prior work authorizations would be ineligible for receiving a work authorization during their release from detention.

IIRIRA stipulated mandatory detention for noncitizens who furnished fraudulent documents or have convictions for aggravated felonies, including "crimes involving moral turpitude", as well as noncitizens found to have "membership in a terrorist organization". Demore v. Kim (2003) upheld the constitutionality of the mandatory detention of noncitizens with qualifying convictions.

The provisions of IIRIRA concerning detention were initially conceptualized as allowing for indefinite detention of noncitizens. However, court decisions have added clarity to the length of time a noncitizen can be detained. In Diouf v. Napolitano (2011), the Ninth Circuit held that an individual facing prolonged immigration detention under section 241(a)(6), inadmissible criminal aliens, of IIRIRA is entitled to be released on bond unless the government establishes the individual is a flight risk or a danger to the community. In addition, these individuals entitled to the same procedural safeguards against prolonged detention as individuals detained under section 236(a) of the Act, including an individualized bond hearing before an immigration judge. The court in Diouf v. Napolitano (2011) acknowledged that it was extending its holding in Casas-Castrillon v. DHS (2008).

Bars to Re-Entry 
Various bars for reentry of noncitizens were established by IIRIRA.

3-Year Bar to Entry 
The 3-year bar to entry concerns noncitizens without lawful present status for more than 180 days but less than 365 days who returned to their home country voluntarily before the initiation of removal proceedings in immigration court. The 3-year bar begins on the date of the individual's departure or removal from the U.S.

10-Year Bar to Entry 
The 10-year bar to entry applies to any noncitizen who was ordered removed in immigration court or to any noncitizen who returned to their home country prior to the final adjudication of their removal proceedings in immigration court who were in the United States without lawful immigration status for one or more years. Individuals in either of these categories are summarily found ineligible for entry for 10 years. If a noncitizen gains admission after the 10-year bar and is subsequently deported, IIRIRA imposed a 20-year bar to entry.

Lifetime Bar to Entry 
Lifetime bars to reentry were established for any noncitizen who was deported due to criminal convictions of aggravated felonies. These individuals face a lifetime bar to reentry.

287(g) Program 

IIRIRA initiated the 287(g) program. The 287(g) program allows state and local law enforcement agencies to enter into agreements with Immigration and Naturalization Service (now Immigration and Customs Enforcement). These agreements allocate to certain agents the ability to "perform a function of an immigration officer in relation to the investigation, apprehension, or detention of aliens in the United States (including the transportation of such aliens across State lines to detention centers)". Under 287(g), law enforcement officers are deputized to gain immigration enforcement authority, such as investigating, apprehending, and detaining noncitizens whom the officer believes to be removable. When agencies enter into 287(g) agreements, the individuals deputized are under the direction of ICE, but they are not considered federal officials.

Local law enforcement is not allowed to enforce immigration law—that authority is vested in the federal government as immigration enforcement is a civil matter. State local law enforcment officials, such as sheriffs' agencies and municipal law enforcement, are only allowed to enforce criminal matters. The 287(g) program has received considerable pushback from immigration scholars and immigrant advocacy groups, who expressed that the program increases racial profiling and undermines immigrants' rights. As of November 2021, there were 142 agencies with signed 287(g) agreements in the United States.

Border Enforcement Provisions 
Among other changes, IIRIRA gave the United States Attorney General broad authority to construct barriers along the Mexico–United States border, and it authorized the construction of a secondary layer of border fencing to support the already-completed 14-mile primary fence. Construction of the secondary fence stalled because of environmental concerns raised by the California Coastal Commission.

IIRIRA substantially increased funding directed toward the Mexico-United States Border. IIRIRA appropriated $12 million of funding for multilayered fencing starting near San Diego, California and extending east for 14 miles. This funding was used to supplement existing fencing and add second and third layered fencing along that portion of the border.

In addition to the multilayered fencing near San Diego, California, IIRIRA allocated additional technology and funding for the Border Patrol. Included in this allocation were "fixed wing aircraft, helicopters, four-wheel drive vehicles, sedans, night vision goggles, night vision scopes, and sensor units". (section 103). IIRIRA required that the number of full-time, active-duty border patrol agents would increase by at least 1,000 "in each of the fiscal years 1997, 1998, 1999, 2000, and 2001". IIRIRA also funded an increase of 300 supportive personnel in each of the fiscal years of 1997, 1998, 1999, 2000, and 2001. These new border patrol agents were to be stationed at areas with high proportions of illegal crossing, as measured within the previous year. Such areas were largely concentrated at the southern border (Mexico-United States Border).

IIRIRA targeted funding for agents and militarized technology to "areas of the border identified as areas of high illegal entry into the United States in order to provide a uniform and visible deterrent to illegal entry on a continuing basis". In doing so, IIRIRA appropriated consistent funding that supported a border enforcement strategy known as "prevention through deterrence". Prevention through deterrence was first initiated in the early 1990s, and it aimed to reduce the number of migrants entering without authorization at high-traffic urban areas. According to reports by the Government Accountability Office, prevention through deterrence increased the number of migrants that died while crossing into the United States. Such strategies have been criticized as unconstitutional and deemed in violation of human rights.

Higher education restrictions 
IIRIRA expanded the restrictions on federally distributed post-secondary education funds that were initially enacted with the Personal Responsibility and Work Opportunity Reconciliation Act of 1996 (PRWORA). PRWORA denied federal funding for post-secondary education to most groups of noncitizens. IIRIRA extended these restrictions, applying them to state-level funding decisions. Under IIRIRA, states cannot make undocumented immigrants eligible for in-state tuition rates for post-secondary education unless all citizens and nationals are also eligible, regardless of their state of residence.

Several states have passed tuition-equality laws by allowing anyone regardless of legal status to apply for in-state tuition if they meet the state's eligibility requirements. States have overcome these restrictions by basing eligibility on in-state tuition on factors besides residence, such as attendance at a high school in the state. These provisions allow anyone, regardless of their immigration or citizenship status, to apply for in-state tuition if they meet the eligibility requirements. In doing so, the states have complied with the mandates established by IIRIRA and PRWORA.

Voting

IIRIRA made it a criminal offense for a noncitizen to vote in a federal election. This, however, does not apply to those who have resided in the United States as non-citizen U.S. nationals or permanent residents while they were under the age of 16 years, and both of their parents are U.S. citizens.

Impact 

A 2018 paper found that the Act reduced the health and mental health outcomes of Latin-American undocumented immigrants in the United States by escalating their fear that they would be deported.

In addition, this policy has been criticized by the Journal on Migration and Human Security for imposing overwhelming hurdles on refugees seeking asylum in the United States. These hurdles, such as mandatory detention and application deadlines, are argued to undermine the obligations the United States has under the Refugee Convention Protocols of 1967. Furthermore, a paper in the Journal on Migration and Human Security analyzed a 2011 test conducted by the Migration Policy Institute aimed at exploring any negative externalities the 287(g) program had on the communities of Frederick County, Maryland. The journal found that, after recording arrests by the Frederick County Sheriff's Office, there was evidence pointing towards racial profiling against Hispanics in the area.

The scope of the law's authority was judged by the U.S. Supreme Court in the 2022 Biden v. Texas ruling, which found in a 5-4 decision that the President had the direct authority to regulate the law's Migrant Protection Protocols without approval from Congress.

See also 
 Antiterrorism and Effective Death Penalty Act of 1996
 Immigration and Nationality Technical Corrections Act of 1994
 Immigration Act of 1990
 Anti-Drug Abuse Act of 1988
 Personal Responsibility and Work Opportunity Act
 Remain in Mexico
 287(g)
 Immigration Detention

Notes and references 
This article in most part is based on law of the United States, including statutory and latest published case law.

Further reading

 Warner, Judith Ann. "Illegal Immigration Reform and Immigrant Responsibility Act of 1996." in Richard T. Schaefer, ed., Encyclopedia of Race, Ethnicity, and Society (2008) pp 677–80.

External links 
 Illegal Immigration Reform and Immigration Responsibility Act
 
 USCIS Factsheet, March 1997



Acts of the 104th United States Congress
United States federal immigration and nationality legislation
Illegal immigration to the United States